Estádio Santa Rosa is a multi-use stadium located in Novo Hamburgo, Brazil. It is used mostly for football matches and hosts the home matches of Esporte Clube Novo Hamburgo. The stadium has a maximum capacity of 17,000 people.

External links
Templos do Futebol

Football venues in Rio Grande do Sul
Esporte Clube Novo Hamburgo